Zahirul Islam was an Indian politician. He was elected Member of Assam Legislative Assembly from Mankachar constituency in Assam. He was five terms MLA from 1962 till 1972 as an Independent, from 1978 till 1983 as a member of Janata Party, and as a member of Indian National Congress two terms during 1983 to 1985. 
He was reelected for the term from 1991 to 1996.

References

Living people
Year of birth missing (living people)
Indian National Congress politicians from Assam